The DC Circulator is a bus system in Washington, D.C. The District of Columbia Department of Transportation operates the service in a public–private partnership with RATP Dev.

The DC Circulator buses are similar to shuttle buses since they operate on a predictable fixed route and schedule, and run between the city's main attractions and some of the more popular neighborhoods for visitors. The service began in 2005, and passengers increased as the routes grew from two to five. Ridership peaked in 2011, and has decreased since then.

The fare per ride is $1.00. The subsidy per rider is unusually high; in 2016, it averaged $3.32.

History
The concept of a separate downtown bus was included in a 1997 report by the National Capital Planning Commission (NCPC). The report called for "a simple, inexpensive, and easily navigable surface transit system that complements Metrobus and Metrorail." The next year, representatives of the Commission, the District of Columbia Department of Transportation, the Washington Metropolitan Area Transit Authority, and the Downtown D.C. business improvement district met to plan what would become the Circulator.

After selecting First Transit as the system operator, the DC Circulator started service in July 2005 with two routes: one along K Street from Union Station to Georgetown, and a second from the Walter E. Washington Convention Center to the Southwest Waterfront.

Additional routes were later added to serve the National Mall (2006), the 14th Street Corridor (2009), the Washington Navy Yard (2009), Rosslyn to Dupont Circle (2010), and the Skyland Town Center development in Southeast Washington (2011). The two lines that served the National Mall and the Southwest Waterfront were discontinued in 2011 due to low ridership and redundant service. The National Mall route was reinstated on June 15, 2015. The route is operated in collaboration with the National Park Service.

A report released in March 2011 calls for developing better routes to replace those that had served the National Mall and Southwest Waterfront, and adding new service to the U Street Corridor, portions of Upper Northwest, and neighborhoods east of the Anacostia River.

In 2018, RATP Dev replaced First Transit as the operator of the Circulator.

From February 2019 until October 2019, DC Circulator rides were free under Mayor Bowser Fair Shot initiative. However the $1 fare was reinstated due to increased ridership. However some city officials are looking into reinstating the free rides. Rides were free again due to the COVID-19 pandemic until the $1 fare was reinstated again on October 1, 2021.

Accidents
On April 18, 2007, a driver of a bus was off-duty and had left the bus to attend to other business. While he was out of the bus, the bus rolled back and crashed into a Georgetown University building. One woman was injured.

Routes
The DC Circulator has six lines operating at 10-minute intervals.

Georgetown – Union Station 
This east-west line connects Georgetown with Union Station and operates primarily along Wisconsin Avenue, K Street, and Massachusetts Avenue. Eastbound, the bus starts on Wisconsin Avenue at Whitehaven Street in Georgetown. Westbound, the route starts in the bus level of the Union Station parking garage.

Woodley Park – Adams Morgan – McPherson Square Metro 
This line operates between Woodley Park, Adams Morgan, and McPherson Square via the 14th Street Corridor. Part of this route replaced the discontinued Metrobus 98 route.

Rosslyn – Georgetown – Dupont 
This line operates from Dupont Circle primarily via M Street through Georgetown and travels over the Key Bridge to Rosslyn. This route replaced the former Georgetown Metro Connection "blue bus."

Eastern Market – L’Enfant Plaza 
This line connects Eastern Market and L'Enfant Plaza through Navy Yard & the DC Wharf District.

Congress Heights – Union Station via Barracks Row 
This line operates from the Congress Heights and Union Station east of the Anacostia River via Barracks Row on Capitol Hill. This route replaced the discontinued Metrobus 94 line.

National Mall Route 
This 15-stop loop line operates from Union Station to most of the major attractions on or near the Mall, including ones that are at some distance from Metro stations, such as the Lincoln, Jefferson, World War II, FDR, and Martin Luther King. Jr. memorials.

Seasonal Routes

Zoo Express Line
This line operates from Woodley Park station to Smithsonian National Zoo during the summer season. The service first run operated between May 4, 2019 and September 30, 2019. DC Circulator plans on operating the line again during summer seasons.

Former routes

Smithsonian – National Gallery of Art 
Until 2011 this line ran only on summer weekends, serving the National Mall in a loop along Constitution Avenue, 1st Street NE/SE, Independence Avenue, and 17th Street NW/SW. The line was replaced by the more extensive National Mall route in June 2015.

Convention Center – SW Waterfront 
A north-south line connected the Washington Convention Center with the Southwest Waterfront and operated primarily along 7th and 9th streets, which have bus lanes. The service was eliminated on September 25, 2011 due to low ridership. A new Metrobus route, 74, was opened on September 23, 2011 along the 7th Street corridor between the Washington Convention Center and the Waterfront neighborhood, replacing the Circulator line and the eliminated portion of Metrobus Routes 70 and 71 from Pennsylvania Avenue to the South. The 74 bus costs more to ride and offers less frequent service, but the District officials said the ridership on the Circulator was too low to continue it.

Potomac Ave Metro – Skyland via Barracks Row 
This line operated from the Potomac Avenue Metro station and Skyland Town Center east of the Anacostia River via Barracks Row on Capitol Hill. It was replaced by the Congress Heights – Union Station route on June 24, 2018 replacing Metrobus Route 94.

Union Station – Navy Yard Metro 
This line connected Union Station and Navy Yard through Capitol Hill, with extended service on Washington Nationals game days. This route was replaced by the Eastern Market – L’Enfant Plaza route on June 24, 2018. Also this route replaced the discontinued Metrobus N22 line.

Fleet

Retired Fleet

See also 
 Public-private partnerships in the United States

References

External links 
 
 Circulator Map

Bus transportation in Washington, D.C.
Public–private partnership
Public–private partnership projects in the United States
RATP Group